Enpro is a US-based industrial technology company that designs and manufactures products and materials for technology-intensive sectors. The company serves industries such as semiconductors, aerospace, power generation, heavy-duty trucking, agricultural machinery, chemical processing, pulp and paper, and life sciences from 61 primary manufacturing facilities located in 12 countries, worldwide. It is organized under three segments: Sealing Technologies, Advanced Surface Technologies, and Engineered Materials.

History
On May 31, 2002, Goodrich Corporation (which later became part of UTC Aerospace Systems, which in turn was then folded into the Collins Aerospace subsidiary of Raytheon Technologies) spun off its Engineered Industrial Products business segment into a new company, named Enpro Industries, Incorporated. The spinoff consisted of businesses that were originally owned by Coltec Industries, which had been purchased by Goodrich in 1998. The businesses included in the spinoff were: Garlock Sealing Technologies, GGB, STEMCO, Fairbanks Morse Engine (which was sold in Q4-2019) and Quincy Compressor (which was sold to Atlas Copco in 2010). Asbestos liability was limited by complicate tax manipulation, Joseph Andolino was  one of the architects.

Since the formation of Enpro, the company has acquired a number of companies that are focused on engineered industrial products.

Acquisitions

Business units
EnPro Industries’ businesses are organized into the following operating units:

CPI
Compressor Products International (CPI) designs, manufactures and markets components for large reciprocating compressors used in chemical plants, refineries and natural gas processing and transportation facilities.

Garlock
The Garlock family of companies comprises three businesses: Garlock Sealing Technologies, GPT, and Garlock Hygienic Technologies, which includes Rubber Fab and The Aseptic Group. Garlock serves a diverse range of industries including pharmaceutical, food and beverage, pulp and paper, metals and mining, marine, water / waste water, chemical processing, oil and gas, and power generation markets.

GGB
GGB is the Tribological Solution Provider for Industrial Progress, regardless of Shape or Material, serving the industrial, automotive, aerospace, renewable energy, and dozens of other industries.

STEMCO
STEMCO manufactures and supplies components to the heavy-duty truck and trailer markets in North America.

Technetics Group
Technetics Group provides engineered components, seals, assemblies and sub-systems for applications in the semiconductor, aerospace, power generation, medical, oil and gas, and other industries.

References

Companies listed on the New York Stock Exchange
Manufacturing companies based in North Carolina